Total Analysis System (TAS) describes a device that automates and includes all necessary steps for chemical analysis of a sample e.g. sampling, sample transport, filtration, dilution, chemical reactions, separation and detection.

µTAS 
A new trend today is creating Micro Total Analysis Systems - µTAS. Such a system shall shrink a whole laboratory to chip-size lab-on-a-chip.  Because of its very small size, such a system can be placed close to a sampling site.  It also can be very cost effective thinking of chip technologies, sample sizes and analysis time. It also reduces the exposure of the toxic chemical on the lab personnel which is an added advantage than the conventional techniques. Another advantage of this technology is that the point-of-use diagnostic kits which do not require skilled technicians during the epidemical events and thus help to save millions of lives.

See also
 Microelectromechanical systems
Microfluidics
Bio-MEMS
Lab-on-a-Chip

 Analytical chemistry